Parag Sanghvi is an Indian film, producer, CEO of Alumbra Entertainment & Lotus Film company. He is a business management graduate. The  former M.D. of media company K. Sera Sera, is known for financing and distributing films. His recent home productions include Partner, Bhoot Returns and The Attacks of 26/11.

References

External links 
Parag Sanghvi Official Website
Parag Sanghvi announces two big-budget movies under his banner along with Eros International Group - Hindustan Times Updated: Oct 31, 2019 21:32 IST
Parag Sanghvi to join hands with Prakash Jha's productions upcoming movie 'Khalifey' starring 4 top actors of the industry - ANI News Updated: Oct 30, 2019 18:09 IST
https://archive.today/20130117012121/http://www.apunkachoice.com/names/par/parag_sanghvi/cid_310677/filmography/

Year of birth missing (living people)
Living people
Film producers from Mumbai
Indian film distributors
Indian television producers